Chase Austin Clement (born June 11, 1986) is a former American football quarterback. Clement played college football for Rice University, where he finished his career ranked first in school history with 9,785 passing yards and 11,526 yards total offense. He has played professionally for the Las Vegas Locomotives of the United Football League (UFL), leading the team to a championship in 2010.

College career
Clement and Rice wide receiver Jarett Dillard hold the NCAA Division I FBS record for career touchdowns between a quarterback-receiver tandem with 51. He also broke Conference USA passing records. He earned second-team All-Conference USA honors in 2007 after completing 59.1 percent of his passes for 3,377 yards with 29 touchdowns and 16 interceptions. Those numbers only improved in his first-team all-conference senior season: 66.5 percent for 4,119 yards, 44 touchdowns and seven interceptions. In his senior year, Clement earned the C-USA MVP honors and lead the Owls to their second bowl game in the last three years winning the 2008 Texas Bowl, he was named the MVP of the game. Clement finished his college career with 125 career touchdowns (99 pass, 25 rush and one receiving). He is in second place on the C-USA lists for career touchdowns and touchdown passes behind Case Keenum (178 and 155). Clement tied former Heisman Trophy winner Matt Leinart on the NCAA career touchdown pass list with 99.

Professional career
Clement was a prospect for the 2009 NFL Draft but he went undrafted.

Hamilton Tiger-Cats
He was signed by the Hamilton Tiger-Cats of the Canadian Football League (CFL) on June 2, 2009, but retired on June 6, after one preseason practice.

Las Vegas Locomotives
Clement was later signed by the Las Vegas Locomotives of the UFL. On November 6, Clement got his first action at quarterback. When the Locos were trailing the Sacramento Mountain Lions 21–0 at the half, head coach Jim Fassel benched starter Drew Willy and started Clement for the second half. Clement would lead a sensational comeback attempt, tying the game at 24 by leading the Locos to scores on his first four drives while scoring two rushing touchdowns. Sacramento would end up winning the game 27–24.

Clement led the Locomotives to a 23–20 victory over the Florida Tuskers in the second UFL championship game, and won the game MVP award. Clement also led the Locomotives to the third UFL championship game, losing 34–17 to the Virginia Destroyers.

Houston Texans
The Houston Texans worked out Clement on November 21, 2011 to help with the team's quarterback situation after season-ending injuries to Matt Schaub and Matt Leinart.

Jacksonville Jaguars
The Jacksonville Jaguars worked out Clement in early January 2012.

San Francisco 49ers
Clement worked out with the San Francisco 49ers on March 19, 2012.

Winnipeg Blue Bombers
The Winnipeg Blue Bombers of the CFL worked out Clement in March 2013. He signed with the team on April 8. Winnipeg released him during final roster cuts on June 22.

Dallas Cowboys
Clement worked out with the Dallas Cowboys on July 16, 2013.

References

Further reading

External links
 Rice Owls bio

1986 births
Living people
American football quarterbacks
Las Vegas Locomotives players
Players of American football from San Antonio
Rice Owls football players